Finch GO Bus Terminal is a bus terminal in Toronto, Ontario, Canada. It serves to connect the transit services of York Region to the north and the transit services of Toronto. It is located at 5697 Yonge Street on the northeast corner of Bishop Avenue and Yonge Street, one block north of Finch Avenue, connected by tunnel to Finch subway station. The station facilities, constructed by GO Transit, are within a major east-west electricity transmission corridor owned by Hydro One Networks.

Transit agencies that use the terminal are GO Transit and York Region Transit/Viva

The terminal was built by the Toronto Transit Commission in 1974, and was acquired by the Toronto Area Transportation Operating Authority in March 1977.

An elevator and new platforms were added in mid-2005 to accommodate Viva bus rapid transit service, which York Region Transit began operating on September 4, 2005. It is the southern terminus of the Viva Blue and Viva Pink lines. New shelters were added along the south platform to replace the smaller shelters to accommodate more passengers waiting for buses at the terminal.

Platforms for GO Transit and York Region Transit remain unchanged until September 2012. The platform next to the station, formerly for GO Transit buses was rebuilt and lowered for Viva buses.

Inside is a newsstand, washrooms and indoor Viva kiosks. A set of escalators connects to the Finch TTC station across the street. A set of covered stairs on the south side of the station also connects to Finch.

The east of the platforms and next to the TTC east parking lot is a parking area for 13 standard buses (30–40 foot buses). Passenger pickups by taxis can be made from the taxi stand on the southeast side of the station next to Bishop Avenue, an off-street driveway.

Bus service 

YRT, which also operates the Viva bus rapid transit routes, TTC, and GO Transit routes connect to this terminal.

York Region Transit

GO Transit

TTC
For Toronto Transit Commission bus connections, see the adjoining Finch subway station

Notes:
Tai Pan Tours and Safeway Tours use platform 17 and stops along Bishop Avenue respectively to pick up and drop off patrons for tours and the shuttle to Fallsview Casino.
Brampton Transit stopped service to Finch in 2010 with the introduction of their 501 Züm Queen. Previously Brampton Transit buses operated to Finch as part of the Route 77 service that was jointly operated with York Region Transit.

References

External links

GO Transit bus terminals
York Region Transit Terminals
Transport infrastructure completed in 1974
1974 establishments in Ontario